Alfonso de Urresti Longton (born 7 March 1966) is a Chilean lawyer and politician.

References

External links
 

1966 births
Living people
University of Chile alumni
Socialist Party of Chile politicians
People from Viña del Mar
Senators of the LV Legislative Period of the National Congress of Chile
Senators of the LVI Legislative Period of the National Congress of Chile